Baron Hervey is an aristocratic title that has been created three times, once in the Peerage of Ireland and twice in the Peerage of England.

The first creation was in the Peerage of Ireland in 1620, when Sir William Hervey, 1st Baronet, was made Baron Hervey, of Rosse in County Wexford. He had been created Baronet of St. Martin's in the Fields on 31 May 1619.

The second creation was in 1628, when the same William Hervey was also made Baron Hervey, of Kidbrooke, Kent, in the Peerage of England. When William Hervey died in 1642, both titles became extinct.

The third creation came in 1703 in the Peerage of England, when John Hervey was made Baron Hervey, of Ickworth, Suffolk. John Hervey was a second cousin thrice removed of William Hervey and was later created Earl of Bristol.

Baron Hervey (1620, 1628)
William Hervey, 1st Baron Hervey (died 1642)

Barons Hervey (1703)
See Marquess of Bristol

References

Extinct baronies in the Peerage of Ireland
Extinct baronies in the Peerage of England
Baronies in the Peerage of England
1620 establishments in Ireland
1628 establishments in England
1703 establishments in England
1642 disestablishments in Ireland
1642 disestablishments in England
Noble titles created in 1620
Noble titles created in 1628
Noble titles created in 1703